Herkimer may refer to:

People:
 Johan Jost Herkimer (1732–1795), United Empire Loyalist, brother of Nicholas Herkimer
 John Herkimer (1773–1848), American lawyer and politician from New York
 Lawrence Herkimer (1925–2015), American innovator in the field of cheerleading
 Nicholas Herkimer (c. 1728–1777), militia general in the American Revolutionary War

Places:
 Fort Herkimer, a fort located on the southern side of the Mohawk River in central New York
 Herkimer County, New York, a county located in the U.S. state of New York
 Herkimer (town), New York, a town in Herkimer County, New York
 Herkimer (village), New York, a village in Herkimer County, New York
 Herkimer, Kansas
  Herkimer Street, a road in Hamilton, Ontario, Canada
 Herkimer Street, a street in Baltimore, Maryland
 Herkimer Creek, a creek in Otsego County, New York

Other:
 Herkimer diamond, a generic name for double-terminated quartz crystals first discovered in Herkimer County, New York
 USS Herkimer. An Alamosa-class cargo ship that served the US Navy during the final months of World War II; later serving as USAT Herkimer, with the US Army and then as USNS Herkimer with the Military Sea Transportation Service.
 Herkimer, a fictional supervillain that was an enemy of Captain Marvel.
 Herkimer, a fictional disembodied head from the TV series Special Unit 2
 Herkimer Battle Jitney, a fictional armoured truck in the 1999 movie Mystery Men